Emmett Francis "Ted" Ryan (6 August 1885 – 12 February 1937) was an Australian rules footballer who played with Richmond and St Kilda in the Victorian Football League (VFL).		
		
A veteran of the New Guinea campaign in the First World War, he later worked for Vacuum Oil in Melbourne. He was the father of the soldier, publisher and writer Peter Ryan.

References

External links 		
Ted Ryan at afltables.com	

1885 births
1937 deaths
Australian rules footballers from Victoria (Australia)
Richmond Football Club players
St Kilda Football Club players
Australian rules footballers from Adelaide
Military personnel from Melbourne
Australian military personnel of World War I